Gracilibacillus boraciitolerans is a highly boron-tolerant and moderately halotolerant bacterium. It is motile, Gram-positive and rod-shaped. T-16XT (=DSM 17256T =IAM15263T =ATCCBAA-1190T) is its type strain.

References

Further reading
Whitman, William B., et al., eds. Bergey's manual of systematic bacteriology. Vol. 3. Springer, 2012.
Logan, Niall A., and Paul De Vos, eds. Endospore-forming soil bacteria. Vol. 27. Springer, 2011.

External links

LPSN
Type strain of Gracilibacillus boraciitolerans at BacDive -  the Bacterial Diversity Metadatabase

Bacillaceae
Bacteria described in 2007